Maurissa Tancharoen in Los Angeles, California) is an American actress, producer and writer.

Career
Tancharoen's first paid script came in 2001 when she sold Revolution Studios an untitled pitch in which two Asian American FBI agents investigate a gang in South Central Los Angeles by working undercover as Korean grocery store clerks. Her production credits include working as assistant to producer Mark Tinker on NYPD Blue and to William M. Finkelstein on Brooklyn South, as well as being co-executive producer of the series DanceLife.

As a writer and story editor Tancharoen has worked on Agents of S.H.I.E.L.D., Starz series Spartacus: Gods of the Arena, Drop Dead Diva, Dollhouse and the short-lived sitcom Oliver Beene. She also worked on Spartacus: Vengeance.

In addition to writing, Tancharoen also played a brief acting role in Dollhouse as the active Kilo (like the other Los Angeles actives named from the NATO phonetic alphabet), and co-wrote and performed lyrics for "Remains" with Jed Whedon for the Dollhouse episode "Epitaph One". She co-wrote Dr. Horrible's Sing-Along Blog and appeared onscreen as Groupie #1, as well as on the DVD audio track "Commentary! The Musical", in which she sings about the scarcity of non-stereotyped roles in television and film for actors of Asian origin. She appeared onscreen as a singer in Joss Whedon's 2011 adaptation of Much Ado About Nothing; provided Zelda's singing voice in the season 2 episode "The Musical" of The Legend of Neil, a spoof based on the video game The Legend of Zelda; and performed backing vocals and danced in the video for The Guild parody song "(Do You Wanna Date My) Avatar" released August 17, 2009.

Tancharoen worked with Jed Whedon and Joss Whedon on The Avengers, and was a showrunner and executive producer for Agents of S.H.I.E.L.D.

Personal life
Tancharoen is of Thai origin. She attended Occidental College, where she wrote two plays that won the Argonaut & Moore literary award. Her father, Tommy Tancharoen, is a transportation coordinator for Hollywood movies. Her brother Kevin Tancharoen is a director, whose feature film debut is 2009's Fame. On April 19, 2009, she married fellow writer Jed Whedon, brother of Joss Whedon. Their first child, a daughter, was born in 2015.

In her younger years, Tancharoen was a member of the girl band Pretty in Pink. The band broke up before seeing major success and shortly after Tancharoen was diagnosed with lupus that required chemotherapy.

Awards
In 2009, Tancharoen won a Streamy Award for Best Writing for a Comedy Web Series for Dr. Horrible's Sing-Along Blog.

Studio album
 Wake Up (with Pretty In Pink) (Motown, 1991)

Acting credits

Film

Television

Production credits

Notes

External links

 

1975 births
Actresses from Los Angeles
American film actresses
American people of Thai descent
American television actresses
American television writers
American women television writers
Hugo Award-winning writers
Living people
Occidental College alumni
People with lupus
Screenwriters from California
Whedon family
Writers from Los Angeles